There are several systems for transliteration of the Manchu alphabet which is used for writing the Manchu and Xibe languages. These include transliterations in Latin script and in Cyrillic script.

Transliteration in Latin script (romanization)
The romanization used in most recent western publications on Manchu is the one employed by the American sinologist Jerry Norman in his Comprehensive Manchu-English Dictionary (2013), a central reference tool in modern Manchu studies.

This system, which has become the de facto modern standard in English-language publications, is the most recent incarnation of a system originally designed by the German linguist Hans Conon von der Gabelentz for his 1864 edition of the Manchu translation of the Four Books and other Chinese classics. As he explains:"Because Manchu possesses an alphabetic script, it was acceptable, as being without any disadvantage whatsoever, to replace the indigenous Manchu script, the use of which would have made printing much more difficult and expensive, by our alphabet. I started out from the principle of substituting a single symbol for each Manchu letter, while avoiding the addition of diacritical marks as much as possible."

With his new system, Gabelentz did away with cumbersome transliterations such as dch, tch, kh, replacing them with j, c, h. The result has been described as a "simple and convenient system".

Gabelentz also used this transliteration in his Manchu-German dictionary (1864), and the system was adopted unchanged by other German manchurists such as Erich Hauer for his dictionary (1952–55), and Erich Haenisch for his grammar (1961).

In the 19th century the system was adopted, with minor changes, by the French linguist Lucien Adam in his grammar (1873), by the Belgian linguist Charles de Harlez in his handbook (1884), and by the German diplomat and linguist Paul Georg von Möllendorff. In English-language publications, the latter is often incorrectly credited with being the inventor of the system, probably because his Manchu Grammar (1892) was the first book in English to use it. Thus Norman himself refers to "the Möllendorff system of romanization". Authors writing in French and German generally recognize Gabelentz as its creator.

The system as used by Gabelentz (1864), Möllendorff (1892) and Norman (2013) is set out below, with the older system used by Gabelentz in his grammar (1832) added for comparison. Also in the table are the Pinyin-based system designed by Hu (1994) which is the standard in Chinese-language publications, and the input system of BabelPad. The table follows the traditional order of the Manchu alphabet.

The standard transliteration system follows the following conventions:

In Manchu orthography, the use of either the velars or the uvulars is largely predictable: velars before e, i, u and uvulars before a, o, ū. The standard transliteration leaves some ambiguity, as the spelling is not entirely predictable in syllable-final position.

The spelling  is transliterated as ng, for example  inenggi "day",  cangkai "only, just",  gung "duke".

The spelling  is transliterated as i, for example  baita "thing",  meihe "snake",  duin "four".

In the standard transliteration, the spellings sh and th each represent two separate consonants, as in eshen  "uncle", butha  "hunting, fishing". In Hu’s transliteration, separate s and h are written as s’h (es’hen) to avoid confusion with sh (Norman š). Gabelentz (1864) used the transcriptions sḥ and tḥ, with a dot under the h (esḥen, butḥa).

Transliteration in Cyrillic script (cyrillization)
The following transliteration (paired in the table below with the Norman system) was designed by the Russian diplomat and linguist Ivan Zakharov and used in his important Manchu dictionary (1875) and grammar (1879). He applies the following rules:

The velars are marked with a macron (к̄,  г̄, х̄) when followed by а (a), о (o) and у (u); к̄  is also used for the velar when it occurs in syllable-final position.

The spelling  is transliterated as н before velars and uvulars, for example  инэнги "day",  чанкай "only, just"; before other consonants, and in word-final position,  is transliterated as нъ, for example  синънамби  "to listen",  гунъ  "duke".

The back vowel [ʊ] is transliterated у after the uvulars, and ӯ after other consonants (see Table below).

The spelling  is transliterated as й, for example  байта "thing",  мэйхэ "snake",  дуйнь "four".

Combinations of  plus vowel are transliterated with the Cyrillic iotified vowel letters я (ya), ѣ (ye), іō (yo), ю (yu), and ю̄ (yū).

Notes and references

Cited works

Manchu language
Transliteration